Elpidia glacialis is a species of sea cucumber in the family Elpidiidae. It is found at abyssal depths in the Arctic Ocean, the Barents Sea, the Kara Sea and the north Atlantic Ocean. It was first described in 1876 by the Swedish zoologist Johan Hjalmar Théel after he had collected specimens while accompanying the explorer Adolf Erik Nordenskiöld on an expedition attempting to find the Northeast Passage.

Ecology
Other organisms occupying the same habitat included the sea lily Bathycrinus sp., the sea spider Ascorhynchus abyssi, the brachiopod Waldheimia cranium and the zoanthid Epizoanthus sp. The sea lily and the sea cucumber were the dominant species present, perhaps because echinoderms are able to adopt various foraging strategies to suit the availability of food supplies.

In another study, in the central Arctic Ocean, it was found that most of the megafauna was only found within a certain range of depths, the only exceptions to this being E. glacialis and the predatory swimming snail Limacina helicina. It is a deposit feeder and its abundance may reflect differences in the availability of food in the sediment.

References

Elpidiidae
Animals described in 1876
Taxa named by Johan Hjalmar Théel